Mandy O'Donnell (born 1989) is a female Scottish international lawn and indoor bowler.

Bowls career
In 2011 she won the triples gold medal at the Atlantic Bowls Championships with Lorna Smith and Anne Dunwoodie.

She won the British U-25 title in 2011.

References 

Scottish female bowls players
1989 births
Living people